Real World/Road Rules Challenge 2000 is the third season of the MTV reality game show The Challenge (at the time known as Real World/Road Rules Challenge). The season is directly subsequent to Real World/Road Rules Challenge the season.

Real World/Road Rules Challenge 2000 is the second six-on-six The Challenge in the series. The teams traveled via tour bus starting in Las Vegas, Nevada then moving to the eastern U.S., ending in Miami, Florida after competing in different individual challenges. Each time a team won an individual challenge, they won $10,000. After each mission won, the winning team would invest those 10K in the product of their choice through E-Trade. At the end, the winning team also won any money won in the stock market. The last mission would be for the right to keep the money collected in the pot, an additional cash prize and a car. This season also featured an additional challenge where the two teams had to give up smoking for the duration of filming. If any cast member on either team were caught smoking, their cast would lose the additional challenge.

Cast
Ms. Big: Gladys Sanabria from Road Rules: Latin America

Gameplay

Challenges
Stratos-Fear: 
Demolition Derby: 
Wheel of Wrestling: 
Snake Wrangling: 
Redneck Games: 
Mud Football: 
Swamp Buggy Racing: 
Homemade Swimsuit Contest: 
Stir Crazy: 
Handsome Reward:

Game summary

 Real World
 Road Rules

Mini challenges

Final results
Road Rules won the final challenge, winning brand new 2000 Nissan Xterras. They earned $60,000, while also winning $6,000 in the "Scavenger Hunt" mini-challenge and an additional $1,524 through their E-trade online investment, for a total bank of $67,524 with each team member receiving $11,254.
Real World earned $40,000, while also winning an additional $985 through their E-trade online investment, for a total bank of 40,985 with each team member receiving $6,830.
Both teams lost the additional "Tobacco Free" challenge as Piggy and David were caught smoking. Heather brought a camera man to the girls' bathroom at an RV park to catch Piggy smoking and David fully admitted to smoking during the challenge.

Teams

Memorable moments
 The Real World team organized a fake mission to trick the Road Rules team while they were in Miami. They created a scavenger hunt, asked someone to present it, and convinced a reluctant Road Rules team to complete the mission; items on the list were to get buried in the sand, polish an old man's toes, and give someone a makeover at Sephora. Meanwhile, the Real Worlders partied in South Beach. The next morning, the Real Worlders revealed the truth, and presented the prize, a "box of suckers".

Episodes

Notes

References

External links

The Real World/Road Rules Challenge 2000 cast information and other show data at the Internet Movie Database
MTV's official Road Rules website
MTV's official Real World website

The Challenge (TV series)
2000 American television seasons